"Meine Liebe" is a song by German-Albanian singer Ardian Bujupi featuring Albanian singer and songwriter Elvana Gjata. A German and Albanian language pop song, the lyrics features the theme of love and missing somebody. The official music video for the song was shot in Germany and was uploaded on 1 August 2019 onto YouTube in order to accompany the single's release.

Background and composition 

Running for a duration of three minutes and five seconds, "Meine Liebe" was written by both Ardian Bujupi and Elvana Gjata alongside German producer Dominik Lange. The production for the song was handled by German-Greek producer Nikolaos Giannulidis, who is professionally known as UNIK. The song was composed in  time and is performed in the key of F major in common time with a tempo of 96 beats per minute. It features lyrics in both, the German and Albanian languages. It was made available digitally as a single through Columbia Germany and Sony Music Germany.

Music video 

The accompanying music video for "Meine Liebe" was officially premiered onto the YouTube channel of Ardian Bujupi on 1 August 2019, and further on Apple Music one day after, on 2 August 2019. It was directed by Hasan Kuyucu while Lily Hopkins Raeder acted as the video producer. Maya Lu and Jodi Gardner were additionally hired for styling, make-up and hair styling, respectively. The colorful music video was filmed in the capital city of Berlin, Germany. As of February 2020, the music video has amassed more than 16 million views on YouTube.

Personnel 

Credits adapted from Tidal.

Ardian Bujupisongwriting, vocals
Elvana Gjatasongwriting, vocals
Dominik Langesongwriting
Lex Barkeymastering
UNIKengineering, mixing, producing

Charts

References 

2019 singles
2019 songs
Albanian-language songs
Ardian Bujupi songs
Columbia Records singles
Elvana Gjata songs
German-language songs
German-language Albanian songs
Songs written by Elvana Gjata
Sony Music singles